The 1927 Campeonato Carioca, the 22nd edition of that championship, kicked off on May 1, 1927 and ended on September 18, 1927. It was organized by AMEA (Associação Metropolitana de Esportes Atléticos, or Metropolitan Athletic Sports Association). Ten teams participated. Flamengo won the title for the 6th time. No teams were relegated.

Participating teams 

Before the start of the championship, Syrio e Libanez was suspended by AMEA for not having a stadium of its own (the team usually groundshared with Mangueira instead), and was replaced by Andarahy, that after being passed over for promotion in 1925, hadn't even disputed the Second level in 1926.

System 
The tournament would be disputed in a double round-robin format, with the team with the most points winning the title.

Championship

References 

Campeonato Carioca seasons
Carioca